This is a list of diplomatic missions of Libya.

Under the rule of Muammar al-Gaddafi, Libya broke practice with almost all other countries in 1979 by renaming their embassies "People's Bureaus", with the diplomatic staff known as a local "revolutionary committee".

During the 2011 Libyan civil war, there were two governments claiming to be the de jure government of Libya. One government was led by Gaddafi and the other was the National Transitional Council. Some countries had recognised the NTC as the governing authority of Libya and Libyan ambassadors to those countries were nominated by the NTC.

The NTC was awarded Libya's seat at the United Nations in September 2011 following a vote by the General Assembly.

Current missions

Africa

Americas

Asia

Europe

Oceania

Multilateral organisations
 
Addis Ababa (Permanent Mission to the African Union)

Cairo (Permanent Mission to the Arab League)
 Food and Agriculture Organization
Rome (Permanent Mission to the FAO)

 Brussels (Permanent Mission to the European Union)

Geneva (Permanent Mission to the United Nations and other international organisations)
Nairobi (Permanent Mission to the United Nations and other international organisations)
New York (Permanent Mission to the United Nations)
Vienna (Permanent Mission to the United Nations and other international organisations)

Paris (Permanent Mission to UNESCO)

Gallery

Closed missions

Africa

Americas

Asia

Europe

See also

 Foreign relations of Libya
 Visa policy of Libya

Notes

References

External links

 
Diplomatic missions
Libya